The 2009–10 Challenge de France is the ninth season of the French cup competition for women, organized by the French Football Federation. The competition is open to all women's clubs in French football. The final will be contested on 23 May 2010 at the Stade Robert-Bobin. The defending champions were Montpellier, who defeated Le Mans 3–1 in the 2008–09 edition of the competition. On 23 May 2010, Division 1 Féminine club Paris Saint-Germain won the competition by defeating fellow first division club Montpellier by a score of 5–0 in the final. The victory gives Paris Saint-Germain its first Challenge de France title.

Calendar
On 6 July 2009, the French Football Federation announced the calendar for the Challenge de France.

First round
The draw for the first round of Challenge de France was conducted on 18 December 2009 at the headquarters of the French Football Federation, in Paris by French journalist Christian Jeanpierre and Marilou Duringer, a member of the Federal Council. The matches were played on 10 January 2010. Several matches that were postponed were played on 17 January. The rest of the postponed matches will be contested on 24 January

Second round
The draw for the second round of Challenge de France was based on the results of the first round with the winners advancing to the second round to face each other based on where they were drawn. The matches will be played on 31 January 2010.

Round of 32
The draw for the Round of 32 of the Challenge de France was conducted on 8 February and saw the arrival of clubs based in Division 1 Féminine. The draw was conducted by Jézabel Lemonier and Christophe Pacaud, who hosts the television show Direct Sport and French television channel Direct 8. The matches were played on 21 February.

Round of 16
The draw for the Round of 16 of the Challenge de France was conducted on 24 February at the headquarters of the French Football Federation. The draw was conducted by Sandrine Roux, the current coach of the France women's under-19 team. The matches were played on 7 March.

Quarterfinals
The draw for the quarterfinals and semi-finals of the Challenge de France was held on 8 March 2010. The draw was conducted by Red Cross ambassador and fashion model Adriana Karembeu. The quarterfinals were contested on 21 March.

Semi-finals
The draw for the quarterfinals and semi-finals of the Challenge de France was held on 8 March 2010. The draw was conducted by Red Cross ambassador and fashion model Adriana Karembeu. The semi-finals were contested on 25 April.

Final

See also
 2009–10 D1 Féminine

References

External links
 Official site 

2009–10 domestic association football cups
Cha
Coupe de France Féminine